Andrew Berman is an architectural and cultural heritage preservationist in New York City. He is known for being an advocate of LGBT rights and an opponent of new construction. Berman was named executive director of the Greenwich Village Society for Historic Preservation (GVSHP),  neighborhood preservation organization in New York City, in 2002.

Andrew Berman has served on the boards of the New York State Tenants and Neighbors Coalition, Housing Conservation Coordinators, the Chelsea Reform Democratic Club, the Hell's Kitchen Neighborhood Association, and was a founding member of the West Side Neighborhood Alliance and Friends of Pier 84. He is a member of the Board of Advisers of the Historic Districts Council. Berman was also a plaintiff in the lawsuit to remove private helicopter service from the Hudson River Park.

Since 2002, GVSHP, under Berman's leadership, has secured landmark and zoning protections in the South Village, the Meatpacking District, along the Greenwich Village waterfront, and in the East Village. The organization also led campaigns against development plans by Donald Trump and New York University. Berman has also focused on preserving the history of typically underrepresented groups (e.g., migrants and the working class) and previously overlooked sites and structures (e.g., tenement architecture).

Early life and career
Berman was born and raised in the Bronx, New York, where he graduated from the Bronx High School of Science. He holds a BA in Art History from Wesleyan University, and lives and works on the West Side, Lower Manhattan.

Berman worked for New York City Councilmember Thomas Duane from 1993 to 1999, then for Duane as state senator until 2001. Under Duane, he focused on areas of education, transportation infrastructure, the environment, and senior services in Greenwich Village, Chelsea, and Hell's Kitchen.

Preservation projects and advocacy
Under Berman's leadership, GVSHP has worked with other community groups to secure official landmark protections for around 1,100 buildings in Greenwich Village, the East Village, and NoHo, including 10 new historic districts or historic district extensions, and at least 40 individual landmarks. During his tenure, GVSHP also helped secure community-initiated contextual rezonings and downzonings of nearly 100 blocks of the East and West Village, designed to prevent new development, limit hotel and dormitory construction, preserve existing building stock, and retain and create affordable housing.

Timeline
 2003: Designation of the Gansevoort Market Historic District in the Meatpacking District. 
 2006: Designation of the Far West Village Extension of the Greenwich Village Historic District, the first extension of that district since its designation in 1969.
 2013: Designation of the South Village Historic District, a 250-building district covering more than a dozen blocks south of Washington Square.
 2012: Designation of the East 10th Street Historic District, the first new historic district in the East Village since 1969. 
 East Village/Lower East Side Historic District, the first large-scale historic district in the East Village.

Other preservation efforts Berman has led include:
 Efforts to landmark Mezritch Synagogue, the last remaining operating tenement synagogue in the East Village.
 Webster Hall, a former hall-for-hire used for labor rallies, drag balls and later as a recording studio and music venue.
 Westbeth, a former industrial complex converted into the nation's first subsidized artists’ housing complex.
 University Village's Silver Towers, a trio of concrete brutalist high-rise towers designed by I.M. Pei surrounding a Picasso sculpture which included affordable housing for displaced Lower Manhattan residents of limited income
 128 East 13th Street, New York's last surviving horse auction mart which later served as a women's assembly line training institute during World War II and from 1979 to 2006 was the studio of the artist Frank Stella.
 Tenement at 101 Avenue A, a German social hall and labor organizing center, was later home to Warhol Superstar and Velvet Underground member Nico, and beginning in 1979 was the home of the Pyramid Club, considered one of the most influential performance venues of the downtown scene and the birthplace of politically conscious drag performance art. Due to the insistence of Berman and other advocates, the 2012 East Village/LES Historic District was expanded to include it.
 Tunnel Garage preservation advocacy. One of New York's earliest Art Deco structures and earliest purpose-built parking garages, noted for its polychrome terra cotta medallion showing a Model-T Ford emerging from the nearby, not-yet-built Holland Tunnel, the 1992 building was rejected for designation by the LPC and torn down in 2006. A luxury rental apartment building, 55 Thompson, now stands in its place.

LGBTQ
Berman has focused on historical preservation of sites associated with the Lesbian, Gay, Bisexual & Transgender (LGBT) rights movement. Berman's engagement with the New York City Landmarks Preservation Commission reflect his work to garner recognition of sites such as the Stonewall Inn; Julius’ Bar, and the Gay Activists Alliance Firehouse, for their historic significance.

Berman led a campaign for the landmark protection of a house at 186 Spring Street which had served as a home to figures in the post-Stonewall LGBT rights movement. A determination of eligibility for the house for the State and National Registers of Historic Places was made, upon which Berman publicly criticized the LPC for refusing to landmark the site and allowing it to be demolished.

In April 2013, Berman, on behalf of GVSHP, along with PFLAG and the Church of the Village, unveiled a plaque marking the founding of PFLAG forty years earlier.

New York University
Andrew Berman's work has often included efforts to prevent the expansion of New York University within Greenwich Village, the East Village, NoHo, and satellite campuses. This includes his work with GVSHP to prevent NYU from building a planned 400-foot-tall tower on Bleecker Street, which would have been the tallest structure in Greenwich Village, Berman's participation in litigation blocking city approvals for NYU's planned 20-year expansion plan.

GVSHP also advocated for the expansion of the South Village Historic District, as originally proposed by the New York City Landmarks Preservation Commission, to include several NYU buildings, including the full-block Vanderbilt Hall Law School on Washington Square South – a building which, without the landmark protections which were granted it, could have been replaced under existing zoning by a 300-foot-tall dorm. 
 
Berman also reportedly criticized Donald Trump's plans for a 454-foot-tall “condo-hotel” on Spring Street in the Hudson Square neighborhood adjacent to Greenwich Village, leading rallies and garnering support from civic groups throughout New York City in opposition to the plan, which was ultimately approved by New York City.

Awards
 2006 – Berman named one of New York magazine's "Influentials 2006"
 2006 – GVSHP wins the New York Landmarks Conservancy’s Lucy G. Moses Organizational Excellence Award
 2006 – GVSHP named one of the "Best of NYC 2006" by the Village Voice, which called it the "Best Greenwich Village Defender."
 2007 – GVSHP wins the Preservation League of New York State’s "Excellence in Historic Preservation" award.
 2008 – Berman named one of the "100 Most Powerful People in Real Estate" by The New York Observer, the only preservationist to be included on the list.
 2013 – Berman named to the Vanity Fair "Hall of Fame" for his preservation work at GVSHP.

References

1969 births
Living people
Historical preservationists
Wesleyan University alumni
American LGBT rights activists
Activists from New York City